Adam John Shantry (born 13 November 1982) is an English cricketer. He is a left-handed batsman and a left-arm medium-fast bowler.

Shantry played for Shropshire as a youngster, joining Northamptonshire in 2003 and then moving to Warwickshire two years later. In 2007 he played two first-class matches for Warwickshire taking four wickets but he was released at the end of the season. He subsequently signed a two-year deal with Glamorgan. and scored his first ever 100 against Leicestershire on 6 August 2009 he also has a SC.  He announced his retirement in August 2011, having failed to recover from a persistent knee injury.  In all he claimed 90 wickets in 32 first-class games at an average 24.60.

Born in Bristol, Shantry's father, Brian also played county cricket, for Gloucestershire.

Shantry is a devoted Bristol City fan and follows them around the country in the cricket off-season. Adam and his family live in Shrewsbury. In January 2017 he was promoted to the role of Cricket Professional at Shrewsbury School. His wife is a Maths teacher at the same school.

In September 2013, Shantry was part of a group who swam the English Channel in memory of former teammate Tom Maynard, who died in 2012. He hopes to raise £10,000 for the Tom Maynard Trust.

References

External links

1982 births
Living people
English cricketers
Northamptonshire cricketers
Warwickshire cricketers
Shropshire cricketers
Glamorgan cricketers
Northamptonshire Cricket Board cricketers
Wales National County cricketers
Cricketers from Bristol
English Channel swimmers
Male long-distance swimmers